The list of ship launches in 1667 includes a chronological list of some ships launched in 1667.


References

1667
Ship launches